At the 2006 Winter Olympics, eighteen Nordic skiing events were contested – twelve cross-country skiing events, three ski jumping events, and three Nordic combined events.

2006 Winter Olympics events
2006
Cross-country skiing competitions in Italy

cs:Běh na lyžích na Zimních olympijských hrách 2006